Bacalao (Spanish for cod) may refer to:

 Bacalao (cuisine), dried and salted cod
 Bacalhau, dried and salted cod in Portuguese cuisine
 Bacalao (phantom island), a phantom island depicted on several early 16th century Portuguese maps 
Baccalieu Island, an island by Conception Bay in Newfoundland 
Bacalhao Island, an island off Twillingate in Newfoundland 
 Bacalao (album), 1960 album by Eddie "Lockjaw" Davis and Shirley Scott
 Juana Bacallao, Cuban singer